Roosterville may refer to:
Roosterville, Georgia, unincorporated community in Heard County, Georgia, United States
Roosterville, Missouri, populated place in Clay County, Missouri, United States
Roosterville, Ohio, unincorporated place in Morgan County, Ohio
Dellrose, Tennessee, formerly known as Roosterville, United States